The Van Ness House, also known as the Peter Van Ness Farmhouse, is located at 236 Little Falls Road in the township of Fairfield in Essex County, New Jersey. The house was built about 1740. It was documented by the Historic American Buildings Survey in 1939. It was added to the National Register of Historic Places on July 29, 1977, for its significance in agriculture and architecture.

Van Ness family history
Nine Dutch settlers (Simon Van Ness, Gerebrand Clawson, Hans Spier, Elias Franson, Christopher Steinmets, Andrese Louwrentz, Garret Vanderhoof, Hessell Pieters and Jan Spier) purchased a substantial part of the Horseneck Tract from the Lenape Native Americans in 1701. Later surveys confirmed that Simon Van Ness owned 300 acres of the north-east boundary. When the Board of East Jersey Proprietors began to press settlers to secure Proprietary deeds, Simon produced proof of 'fee simple' purchase from The West Jersey Society a London based land investment partnership. Simon received a confirmation deed on September 3, 1744, After his death, Simon's properties were divided among his four sons and two sons-in-law. His son Isaac was given a substantial portion of the 300 acres in Fairfield including the homestead there. Isaac's son Peter was named executor of the will of Isaac Reyken (Ryker) on September 30, 1768. Peter Van Ness then became the first registered owner of the Van Ness House, along the Passaic River where it can still be found today.

Changes to the house
The house went through some renovation in the 1840s, 1930s, and 1980's.

See also
National Register of Historic Places listings in Essex County, New Jersey

References

External links
 
 
 

Fairfield Township, Essex County, New Jersey
Houses on the National Register of Historic Places in New Jersey
Houses completed in 1720
Houses in Essex County, New Jersey
National Register of Historic Places in Essex County, New Jersey
New Jersey Register of Historic Places
Historic American Buildings Survey in New Jersey
1720 establishments in New Jersey